Boaron is a surname of Italian origin. Notable people with the surname include:

Ilan Boaron (born 1972), Israeli footballer
Yehuda Boaron (born 1965), Israeli footballer

Surnames of Italian origin